This is a list of Dutch television related events from 1977.

Events
2 February - Heddy Lester is selected to represent Netherlands at the 1977 Eurovision Song Contest with her song "De mallemolen". She is selected to be the twenty-second Dutch Eurovision entry during Nationaal Songfestival held at Congresgebouw in The Hague.

Debuts

Television shows

1950s
NOS Journaal (1956–present)
Pipo de Clown (1958–present)

1970s
Sesamstraat (1976–present)

Ending this year

Births
1 February - Sonja Silva, TV presenter, actress, model & singer
21  February - Dennis Weening, TV & radio presenter
13 April - Javier Gozman, Spanish-born stand-up comedian & actor

Deaths